Lokoti is a village in the Mbéré department of the Adamawa Region in Cameroon. The village is crossed by a tar-sealed road.

Climate
The climate is temperate with savannah vegetation.

Infrastructure 
There is a high school for general education, a primary school, and a maternal school. The village also possesses a health centre.

Demographics 
The population consists of Catholics and Muslims.

Economy 
The economy is based on agriculture and motorcycle transport.

References 

Populated places in Adamawa Region